The 1999 Bulgarian Cup Final was played at the Bulgarian Army Stadium in Sofia on 26 May 1999, and was contested between the sides of Litex Lovech and CSKA Sofia. The match was won by CSKA Sofia. Valentin Stanchev scored the winning goal in 82nd minute.

Match

Details

See also
1998–99 A Group

Bulgarian Cup finals
Cup Final
PFC Litex Lovech matches
PFC CSKA Sofia matches